"Party in My Head" is a song by French recording duo Miss Kittin & The Hacker. It is the third and final single from their second album as a duo Two (2009).

Critical reception
Alex Macpherson of The Guardian praised the song for being an exception to the skeletal beats of the duo's First Album, describing it as "enveloped in nostalgia for halcyon nights and propelled by driving bass."

Track listing
 "Party in My Head (Original)" - 6:35	
 "Party in My Head (Mr Pauli Remix)" - 6:15	
 "Party in My Head (Thieves Like Us Remix)" - 4:18	
 "Party in My Head (Kiko Remix)" - 7:26

References

2009 singles
2009 songs
Miss Kittin songs
Songs written by Miss Kittin
Songs written by The Hacker
Electroclash songs